Ronald Rex Green (born 3 October 1956) is a former professional footballer who played as a goalkeeper in the Football League.

Career
Born in Birmingham, England, Green played for Football League teams including two spells at Walsall and Shrewsbury, and spells with Bristol Rovers, Scunthorpe, Wimbledon and Colchester. Green also appeared for a number of non-league teams.

Honours

Club
Walsall
 Football League Fourth Division runner-up (1): 1979–80

References

External links
 Ron Green at Colchester United Archive Database
 

1956 births
Living people
Colchester United F.C. players
Walsall F.C. players
Shrewsbury Town F.C. players
Manchester City F.C. players
Bristol Rovers F.C. players
Alvechurch F.C. players
Scunthorpe United F.C. players
Wimbledon F.C. players
Kidderminster Harriers F.C. players
Bromsgrove Rovers F.C. players
Association football goalkeepers
English footballers
English Football League players
Footballers from Birmingham, West Midlands